The Wargamers Encylopediac Dictionary is a 1981 book written and published by the American Wargaming Association.

Contents
The Wargamers Encylopediac Dictionary is a specialty dictionary intended to cover the entire gaming hobby.

Reception
W.G. Armintrout reviewed The Wargamers Encylopediac Dictionary in The Space Gamer No. 52. Armintrout commented that "The Wargamers Encylopediac Dictionary is certainly not going to help some newcomer trying to decipher the slang in TSG; it will be of partial help with wargames, miniatures, or D&D. I realize a lot of work was done on this booklet. Unfortunately, I think a better selection of terms and less formalism would have been a vast improvement - I don't recommend it."

References

1981 non-fiction books
Wargaming books